= Jimmie Wilson (politician) =

American politician, lawyer

Jimmie Wilson is a lawyer and politician in Arkansas. He served in the Arkansas House of Representatives. He was elected to a second non-consecutive term but in 2020 was ruled ineligible due to a past misdemeanor conviction even though he received a presidential pardon.

A Democrat, His House district was in the Helena, Arkansas and West Helena area.

He is a Missionary Baptist.
